Helmy Halim, also Hilmi Halim (1916 – 1971)  was an Egyptian film director, screenwriter, and producer. He has worked with many stars like Omar Sharif, Salah Zulfikar, Ahmed Ramzy, Faten Hamama and Abdel Halim Hafez.

In 1955, he discovered Ahmed Ramzy and cast him as Ramzy in Ayyamna al-Holwa

Partial filmography
Ayyamna al-Holwa
Ard al-Salam
Hekayit Hob (A Love Story), released: January 12, 1959, starring: Abdel Halim Hafez, Mariam Fakhr Eddine
Maww'ed fil Borg (Appointment at the Tower), released: December, 1962, starring: Salah Zulfikar, Soad Hosny.
Maabodat El Gamahir (The Beloved Diva), released: January, 1967, starring: Abdel Halim Hafez, Shadia.

References

External links

Egyptian film directors
1916 births
1971 deaths